Stanislav Balán (born 30 January 1986) is a Czech professional ice hockey forward for SHK Hodonín of the 2nd Czech Republic Hockey League. He was selected by the Nashville Predators in the 7th round (209th overall) of the 2004 NHL Entry Draft but did not play.

Career statistics

Regular season and playoffs

International

References

External links

1986 births
Living people
Czech ice hockey forwards
Nashville Predators draft picks
PSG Berani Zlín players
HC Dukla Jihlava players
HK Dukla Trenčín players
SHK Hodonín players
HC Karlovy Vary players
HC Lev Poprad players
HC Vítkovice players
HK Poprad players
LHK Jestřábi Prostějov players
Portland Winterhawks players
SK Horácká Slavia Třebíč players
People from Hodonín
Sportspeople from the South Moravian Region
Czech expatriate ice hockey players in the United States
Czech expatriate ice hockey players in Slovakia